Royal Brunei Airlines Flight 238 was a scheduled flight from Labuan to Bandar Seri Begawan and Miri, operated by Merpati Intan on behalf of Royal Brunei Airlines. On 6 September 1997, the Dornier 228 registered as 9M-MIA crashed on approach to Miri, killing both crew members and all eight passengers on board.

Accident
Flight 238, a Dornier 228 took off from Brunei International Airport at 19:03 local time with eight passengers and two pilots on board for a short-haul flight to Miri Airport. The flight crew of flight 238 requested clearance to land at the airport. Air traffic control cleared the flight for the final approach to runway 02 but the flight crew did not radio back the control. The wreckage of the Dornier 228 was found at 07:10 the next morning.

See also
 Aviastar Flight 7503

References

Aviation accidents and incidents in 1997
Aviation accidents and incidents in Malaysia
Accidents and incidents involving the Dornier 228
1997 in Malaysia
September 1997 events in Asia